Charles Henry "Charlie" Giancarlo (born 1957) is an American entrepreneur and investor. He is the chairman and CEO of data storage company Pure Storage. He is a former senior executive of Cisco Systems and Silver Lake Partners.

Education and career
Giancarlo holds a bachelor's degree in electrical engineering from Brown University, a master's degree in electrical engineering from the University of California, Berkeley, and an MBA from Harvard University.

He co-founded Telecom Systems in 1984, and then Adaptive Corporation in 1988.

Giancarlo joined Cisco in 1994 when it acquired Kalpana, an Ethernet switching company, where he was vice president. He became Cisco's first vice president of business development, where he developed Cisco's merger and acquisition strategy and practice. In 1999, he took responsibility for the commercial line of business at Cisco,. He became chief technical officer in 2003 and chief technology officer in July 2004. Giancarlo was responsible for many of Cisco's technologies including Ethernet switching, Wi-Fi, security, IP Telephony, and telepresence, as well as Cisco's entry into markets such as the small and medium business and consumer markets after acquiring Linksys, Scientific Atlanta, and WebEx. Although some analysts thought he might become chief executive after John T. Chambers, Giancarlo resigned from Cisco in December 2007.

In January 2008, he became a managing director and operating partner at the private equity firm Silver Lake Partners.
He was president and CEO of Avaya from June 2008 (replacing Louis D'Ambrosio) through December 2008. He has a son, Andrew. After the appointment of Kevin J. Kennedy as CEO, he became chairman of the board at Avaya, while continuing to serve at Silver Lake where he served on the boards of directors of Silver Lake portfolio companies Mercury Payment Systems, and Vantage Data Centers. In 2013 he was succeeded in his role at Silver Lake by Mark Gillett.

Giancarlo founded ItsOn in 2009, and was a founding investor at other ventures, including Equinix, Blue Jeans Networks, Coraid, Big Switch Networks, Avi Networks, Soraa, Enlighted, Attivo, Exablox,  Formation Data,  LensVector, NetSpeed, and Virtual Instruments.

In August 2017, it was announced that he would replace Scott Dietzen as CEO of Pure Storage.

He serves on the boards of companies such as Accenture, Arista Networks, Tintri, ServiceNow, and Vectra Networks Inc.

References

Further reading
 

Avaya
Avaya employees
American technology chief executives
Living people
American chairpersons of corporations
Brown University School of Engineering alumni
UC Berkeley College of Engineering alumni
Harvard Business School alumni
Cisco people
Silver Lake (investment firm) people
American chief technology officers
1957 births
American people of Italian descent